Ushpizin is a 2004 Israeli film directed by  and written by Shuli Rand. It starred Rand, and his wife, Michal, who had never acted before.

Plot
Moshe and Mali Bellanga are an impoverished, childless, Hasidic baalei teshuva ("returnees to Judaism") couple in the Breslov community in Jerusalem. After Moshe is passed over for a stipend he expected, they cannot pay their bills, much less prepare for the upcoming Jewish holiday of Sukkot.

Moshe admires a particularly beautiful etrog, or citron, one of the four species required for the holiday observance. They console themselves by recalling a saying of Rabbi Nachman of Breslov that difficult times are a test of faith. After some anguished prayer, they receive an unexpected monetary gift on the eve of the holiday and Moshe buys the etrog for 1000 shekels (approx. $300), a large sum of money that is much more than he can afford.

The couple is visited by a pair of escaped convicts, one of whom knew Moshe in his earlier, non-religious life. The convicts become their guests (ushpizin) in the sukkah, creating many conflicts and straining Moshe and Mali's relationship.

Cast
Shuli Rand as Moshe Bellanga
Michal Batsheva Rand as Malli Bellanga
Shaul Mizrahi as Eliyahu Scorpio
Ilan Ganani as Yossef
Avraham Abutbul as Ben Baruch

Locations
Ushpizin was filmed on location in Jerusalem, Israel. While a few scenes were shot in Haredi neighbourhoods, most of the film was shot at the Schneller Orphanage and in Jerusalem's Nachlaot neighbourhood. Several streets in Nachlaot feature frequently in the film: Rama Street (where Ben-Baruch meets Moshe and offers him the Sukkah, and where Moshe and Malli part), Zichron Tuvyah (where Moshe's Yeshiva is located) and Tavor Street, while others appear less frequently or even in single shots. The stone buildings of Nachlaot substitute for the Shmuel Hanavi area, though landmarks such as the Wolfson Towers and the Yad Labanim building reveal the true location.

Soundtrack
No separate soundtrack has been sold, though two of the main songs—"Ata Kadosh" and "Yesh Rak HaKadosh Baruch Hu"—were later released on an album by Adi Ran.

Release and reception
The film received mostly positive reviews, and was described as a heart warming tale for the Sukkot holiday. Michal Batsheva Rand's performance won many praises, being her first performance on screen.

The film was a box-office success, becoming one of the most financially successful Israeli movies of 2005. It attracted many religious and Haredi viewers who normally do not go to the cinema.

Following the release, Ushpizin was ranked by review aggregator Metacritic who gave it 70% out of a 100. Rotten Tomatoes gave the film 94% approval, which was based on 63 reviews. The site's consensus reads: "Ushpizin offers a rare and warmly intimate look into ultra-Orthodox Jewish culture".

Haredi culture
Rand, for religious/modesty reasons, insisted that his wife, who had never acted before, star opposite him in the film.

The film was not directed at the Haredi film consumer, since Haredim do not go to movie theatres. Nonetheless, it attracted much attention and this led to heavy downloading and infringement of the movie from people who otherwise had no access to see the film. After inquiries from people who had watched unauthorized copies of the film asking how to pay, pashkvilen were put up in Haredi neighbourhoods. The advertisements told the public of the financial problem that resulted from the file sharing, a reminder of the prohibition against stealing and included a post office box and telephone number in which to pay with a credit card. Another way to repay the makers of the movie was to call movie theatres, order tickets, and not show up.

Awards and nominations
The film was nominated for three Ophir Awards and Shuli Rand won for Best Actor. In his speech, he thanked God and Rabbi Nachman of Breslov. The film was also nominated for Best Screenplay and Best Supporting Actor for Shaul Mizrahi.

References

External links

2004 drama films
Breslov Hasidism
Films set in Jerusalem
Films shot in Israel
2000s Hebrew-language films
Films about Orthodox and Hasidic Jews
Sukkot
Yiddish-language films
Films scored by Nathaniel Méchaly
Israeli drama films